Drosera allantostigma is a species of pygmy sundew from Australia. The specific epithet "allantostigma" is derived from Latin and means "sausage-shaped stigma" (allantoideus = sausage-shaped; stigma = the receptive surface on the style that pollen germinates on).

Carnivorous plants of Australia
allantostigma
Caryophyllales of Australia